Chet Baker Quartet featuring Russ Freeman is an album by jazz trumpeter Chet Baker originally recorded in 1953 and released as a 10-inch LP on the Pacific Jazz label. The album was reissued on CD in 1998 with 17 bonus tracks originally released on the 10-inch LP Chet Baker Quartet featuring Russ Freeman and 12-inch LPs Pretty/Groovy and The Trumpet Artistry of Chet Baker.

Reception

Allmusic rated the reissued album with 4 stars stating "The 25 selections here provide copious evidence of Baker's uncanny artistry as he develops a dark, yet lyrical, interpretive approach. Immediately evident is the thoughtful synergy between Baker and the comparatively understated Freeman, whose comps help link the respective solos".

Track listing
All compositions by Russ Freeman except as indicated
 "Isn't It Romantic?" (Lorenz Hart, Richard Rodgers) – 3:27 Bonus track on CD reissue   
 "The Lamp Is Low" (Peter DeRose, Bert Shefter) – 2:30 Bonus track on CD reissue    
 "This Time the Dream's on Me" (Harold Arlen, Johnny Mercer) – 2:43 Bonus track on CD reissue    
 "Maid in Mexico" – 2:53 Bonus track on CD reissue   
 "Russ Job" – 2:52 Bonus track on CD reissue   
 "Imagination" (Johnny Burke, Jimmy Van Heusen) – 2:59 Bonus track on CD reissue    
 "Long Ago (and Far Away)" [10" LP Take] (Jerome Kern, Ira Gershwin) – 2:11
 "Long Ago (and Far Away)" [12" LP Take] (Kern, Gershwin) – 2:25 Bonus track on CD reissue    
 "Carson City Stage" (Carson Smith) – 2:35 Bonus track on CD reissue    
 "Easy to Love" (Cole Porter) – 3:08 Bonus track on CD reissue   
 "Batter Up" – 2:15 Bonus track on CD reissue   
 "No Ties" [10" LP Take] – 2:57   
 "No Ties" [12" LP Take] – 2:57 Bonus track on CD reissue   
 "All the Things You Are" (Kern, Oscar Hammerstein II) – 2:53   
 "The Thrill Is Gone" (Ray Henderson song) [10" LP Take] (Lew Brown, Ray Henderson) – 2:44   
 "The Thrill Is Gone" [12" LP Take] (Brown, Henderson) – 2:45 Bonus track on CD reissue   
 "Band Aid" – 2:43   
 "Bea's Flat" – 2:57   
 "Moon Love" [10" LP Take] (Kern, George Grossmith, Jr., P. G. Wodehouse) – 3:15 Bonus track on CD reissue
 "Moon Love" [12" LP Take] (Kern, Grossmith, Wodehouse) – 3:16 Bonus track on CD reissue    
 "Happy Little Sunbeam" – 2:40    
 "Happy Little Sunbeam" [Alternate Take] – 2:24 Bonus track on CD reissue    
 "I Fall In Love Too Easily" (Jule Styne, Sammy Cahn) – 2:02 Bonus track on CD reissue    
 "Winter Wonderland" [78 Take] (Felix Bernard, Richard B. Smith) – 3:16 Bonus track on CD reissue    
 "Winter Wonderland" [LP Take] (Bernard, Smith) – 2:26 Bonus track on CD reissue   
Recorded in Los Angeles on July 24 (track 1), July 27 (tracks 2–4), July 29 & 30 (tracks 5–11) and at Radio Recorders in Hollywood on October 3 (tracks 12–22) and October 27 (tracks 23–25), 1953

Personnel
Chet Baker – trumpet, vocals (on track 23)
Russ Freeman – piano
Bob Whitlock (tracks 1–4), Carson Smith (tracks 5–22), Joe Mondragon (tracks 23–25) – bass
Bobby White (tracks 1–4), Larry Bunker (tracks 5–22), Shelly Manne (tracks 23–25) – drums

References 

1953 albums
Chet Baker albums
Pacific Jazz Records albums
Albums produced by Richard Bock (producer)